Charlie Rowe (25 April 1902 – 15 December 1958) was  a former Australian rules footballer who played with Footscray in the Victorian Football League (VFL).

Notes

External links 
		

1902 births
1958 deaths
Australian rules footballers from Victoria (Australia)
Western Bulldogs players
South Bendigo Football Club players